The Women on the Roof is a 1989 Swedish film written and directed by Carl-Gustav Nykvist. It stars Amanda Ooms and Helena Bergström. It was entered into the 1989 Cannes Film Festival. At the 25th Guldbagge Awards, Stellan Skarsgård won the award for Best Actor. The film was selected as the Swedish entry for the Best Foreign Language Film at the 62nd Academy Awards, but was not accepted as a nominee.

Plot
An innocent and beautiful girl, Linnea (Amanda Ooms) rents an apartment in Stockholm just before World War I. As she works for an old man who owns a photography studio she meets Anna, a photographer (Helena Bergstrom) with whom she develops a complex friendship. Anna's circus-performer boyfriend and European politics complicate Linnea's routine.

Cast
 Amanda Ooms - Linnea
 Helena Bergström - Anna
 Stellan Skarsgård - Willy
 Percy Brandt - Fischer
 Lars Ori Bäckström - Holger
 Katarina Olsson - Gerda
 Leif Andrée - Oskar
 Stig Ossian Ericson - Vicar
 Johan Bergenstråhle - Photographer Halling

See also
 List of submissions to the 62nd Academy Awards for Best Foreign Language Film
 List of Swedish submissions for the Academy Award for Best Foreign Language Film

References

External links
 
 

1989 films
1989 drama films
1980s coming-of-age drama films
Swedish coming-of-age drama films
1980s Swedish-language films
1980s Swedish films